The 1995–96 season was the 97th season of competitive league football in the history of English football club Wolverhampton Wanderers. They played the season in the second tier of the English football system, the Football League First Division.

Although the season began with Graham Taylor as manager, he resigned sixteen games into their league campaign under fan pressure due to the team's poor results. Despite being tipped by many to be one of the promotion favourites - following on from having reached the play-offs in the previous season - the side sat in 18th place at the time of Taylor's exit.

After a period under caretaker manager Bobby Downes, Mark McGhee resigned from Leicester City to become Wolves' new manager in December. Despite a slow upturn in results under McGhee that put the team within three points of a play-off place at the start of April, their form again collapsed and they took just four points from the final 24 available.

The club eventually finished the season in 20th place, only confirming their safety from relegation in their final home game. This represented their lowest finish in the football pyramid since returning to the second level in 1989–90.

Results

Football League First Division

A total of 24 teams competed in the Football League First Division in the 1995–96 season. Each team played every other team twice: once at their stadium, and once at the opposition's. Three points were awarded to teams for each win, one point per draw, and none for defeats. Teams finishing level on points were firstly divided by the number of goals scored rather than goal difference.

The provisional fixture list was released on 20 June 1995, but was subject to change in the event of matches being selected for television coverage or police concerns.

Final table

Source: Statto.com

Results summary

Results by round

FA Cup

League Cup

Players

|-
|align="left"|||align="left"| 
|0||0||0||0||0||0||0||0||0||0||
|-
|align="left"|||align="left"| 
|||0||0||0||2||0||10||0||0||0||
|-
|align="left"|||align="left"| 
|38||0||4||0||4||0||46||0||0||0||
|-
|align="left"|||align="left"| 
|||1||0||0||1||0||||1||0||0||
|-
|align="left"|||align="left"| 
|||1||1||0||||0||||1||0||1||
|-
|align="left"|||align="left"| 
|||0||0||0||0||0||||0||0||0||
|-
|align="left"|||align="left"| 
|||0||1||0||1||0||style="background:#98FB98"|||0||0||0||
|-
|align="left"|||align="left"| 
|||1||2||0||5||0||||1||0||0||
|-
|align="left"|||align="left"|  †
|||0||0||0||0||0||||0||0||0||
|-
|align="left"|||align="left"| 
|||0||0||0||1||0||||0||0||0||
|-
|align="left"|||align="left"| 
|45||6||4||0||6||0||55||6||0||0||
|-
|align="left"|||align="left"| 
|||0||2||0||3||1||||1||0||0||
|-
|align="left"|||align="left"| 
|30||2||4||0||5||0||style="background:#98FB98"|39||2||0||0||
|-
|align="left"|||align="left"| 
|||3||4||0||5||2||style="background:#98FB98"|||5||0||0||
|-
|align="left"|||align="left"|  ¤
|||0||0||0||||0||||0||0||0||
|-
|align="left"|||align="left"| 
|17||0||0||0||0||0||style="background:#98FB98"|17||0||0||0||
|-
|align="left"|||align="left"|  †
|||0||0||0||2||0||||0||0||0||
|-
|align="left"|||align="left"| 
|||3||||0||4||1||||4||0||0||
|-
|align="left"|||align="left"|  ¤
|0||0||0||0||||0||||0||0||0||
|-
|align="left"|||align="left"| 
|||2||3||0||||1||||3||0||0||
|-
|align="left"|||align="left"| 
|||1||||1||4||1||||3||0||0||
|-
|align="left"|||align="left"| 
|0||0||0||0||0||0||0||0||0||0||
|-
|align="left"|||align="left"| 
|||1||0||0||0||0||||1||0||0||
|-
|align="left"|||align="left"| 
|21||2||4||0||0||0||style="background:#98FB98"|25||2||0||0||
|-
|align="left"|||align="left"| 
|||0||||0||6||0||||0||0||1||
|-
|align="left"|||align="left"|  ¤
|0||0||0||0||0||0||0||0||0||0||
|-
|align="left"|||style="background:#faecc8" align="left"|  ‡
|||0||0||0||0||0||style="background:#98FB98"|||0||0||0||
|-
|align="left"|||align="left"| 
|||0||0||0||0||0||||0||0||1||
|-
|align="left"|||align="left"| 
|||0||0||0||||1||||1||0||0||
|-
|align="left"|FW||align="left"| 
|||15||4||2||||0||||17||0||1||
|-
|align="left"|FW||align="left"| 
|||1||0||0||0||0||style="background:#98FB98"|||1||0||0||
|-
|align="left"|FW||align="left"| 
|||0||||0||||0||style="background:#98FB98"|||0||0||0||
|-
|align="left"|FW||align="left"| 
|||16||4||1||6||3||||20||0||0||
|-
|align="left"|FW||align="left"|  †
|||0||0||0||0||0||||0||0||0||
|-
|align="left"|FW||align="left"| 
|||0||1||0||||1||style="background:#98FB98"|||1||0||0||
|}
Source: Wolverhampton Wanderers: The Complete Record

Transfers

In

Out

Loans in

Loans out

Management and coaching staff

Kit
The season saw a new home shirt introduced featuring an embroidered crest and new collar design. The all-white away kit of the previous season was retained. Both were manufactured by Nutmeg Clothing and featured sponsor name of Goodyear.

References

1995-96
Wolverhampton Wanderers